Meton tropicus is a species of beetle in the family Cerambycidae. It was described by Pascoe in 1862. It is known from Australia.

References

Desmiphorini
Beetles described in 1862